Ilham B. Lahia (born 29 December 1967) is an Indonesian boxer. He competed in the men's featherweight event at the 1988 Summer Olympics.

References

External links
 

1967 births
Living people
Indonesian male boxers
Olympic boxers of Indonesia
Boxers at the 1988 Summer Olympics
Place of birth missing (living people)
Featherweight boxers
20th-century Indonesian people
21st-century Indonesian people